Canadian Gardening was first published in February 1990, covering topics including garden profiles, gardening techniques, recipes, projects and design ideas, and regional information and events. The magazine was started and had been owned by Avid Media until 2004 when  Transcontinental Media acquired it.

Published eight times a year, the magazine had a readership of more than 2 ½ million gardeners. In 2007, it was awarded Best Magazine of the Year in the best-selling magazine category, while editor-in-chief Aldona Satterthwaite received an Editor of the Year award from the Canadian Society of Magazine Editors.

In February 2016 it was announced that the magazine and its website would be closed following the Spring issue. The last issue was published in March 2016.

References

External links
 Official website and online version

1990 establishments in Ontario
2016 disestablishments in Ontario
Bi-monthly magazines published in Canada
Hobby magazines published in Canada
Defunct magazines published in Canada
Gardening in Canada
Gardening magazines
Magazines established in 1990
Magazines disestablished in 2016
Magazines published in Toronto